María Conde Alcolado (born 14 January 1997) is a Spanish basketball player who currently plays for USK Praha (women's basketball) and who last played for the Polish team Wisła Can-Pack Kraków. Conde also plays for the Spanish national team.

She participated in the EuroBasket Women 2017.

Club career
Conde played in local club CB Estudiantes since the age of 10, soon developing into one of their best players and winning regional and state youth tournaments. In the 2014-15 season, still in junior years, she made her debut with the senior team in the Spanish second tier league, averaging 15.8 PPP and 6.7 RPP. Her performances attracted the attention of several American colleges, and he opted for Florida State University after talking to fellow Spaniard Leticia Romero. She played in Florida State for two years, averaging 15.6 MPP and 3.3PPG in her sophomore year. 

Conde returned to Spain in 2017 to play for Spar CityLift Girona in the Spanish first-tier league and Europe's second-tier EuroCup. She signed for Polish team Wisła Can-Pack Kraków for the 2018-19 season. She went back to the United States to witness being selected in the third round of the 2019 WNBA draft by the Chicago Sky on April 10, 2019.

EuroCup and EuroLeague stats

National team
Conde started playing with Spain's youth teams at 16, winning a total of five medals from 2013 to 2017. She made her debut with the senior team in 2017, at 20, winning a gold medal in the 2017 Eurobasket. Up to 2021, she had 46 caps, with 4.5 PPP: 

  2013 FIBA Europe Under-16 Championship (youth)
  2014 FIBA Under-17 World Championship (youth)
4th 2015 FIBA Under-19 World Championship (youth)
  2015 FIBA Europe Under-18 Championship (youth) 
  2016 FIBA Europe Under-20 Championship (youth) 
  2017 FIBA Europe Under-20 Championship (youth) 
  2017 Eurobasket
 7th 2021 Eurobasket
 6th 2020 Summer Olympics

Personal life 
Conde's brother Diego is a professional footballer.

References

External links
 
 
 
 
 

1997 births
Living people
Basketball players at the 2020 Summer Olympics
Basketball players from Madrid
Chicago Sky draft picks
Florida State Seminoles women's basketball players
Olympic basketball players of Spain
Small forwards
Spanish expatriate basketball people in Poland
Spanish expatriate basketball people in the United States
Spanish women's basketball players